Nant Mill is a country park in Wrexham County Borough, Wales. It is managed by Wrexham County Borough Council and named after a historic corn mill located on the site. It forms part of the Clywedog Trail and includes a visitor centre and two woods, Nant Wood and Plas Power, from which Offa's Dyke can be seen.

References

Country parks in Wales
Parks in Wrexham County Borough